A leadership election was held by the United Malays National Organisation (UMNO) party in 1984. It was won by incumbent Prime Minister and President of UMNO, Mahathir Mohamad.

Supreme Council election results
[ Source]

Permanent Chairman

Deputy Permanent Chairman

President

Deputy President

Vice Presidents

Supreme Council Members

See also
1986 Malaysian general election
Second Mahathir cabinet

References

1984 elections in Malaysia
United Malays National Organisation leadership election
United Malays National Organisation leadership elections